Nova Cinema is a pay television service available in Greece that broadcasts blockbuster movies and hit series. It is a 24/7 movie service and it launched in 1994, It is owned by Nova, who own and operate a DTH satellite service with the same name and Nova Sports—a sports channel.

In 2015, Nova Cinema has an output deal with HBO to broadcast the biggest hit series in Greece at the same time with the US. The fifth season of Game of Thrones premiered on 12 April 2015 on HBO and Nova Cinema at the same time.

Nova satellite subscribers have access to all four Nova Cinema channels if they subscribe to either the Cinema pack or the Full pack offered by the company.

FilmNet

From 1994 until 1 June 2008, Nova Cinema was known as Filmnet which was one of the oldest names in European pay television history: Originally, service was launched in 1985 targeting Benelux and Scandinavia. In 1997, all Filmnet channels minus the one in Greece were sold to Groupe Canal+ and rebranded as Canal+. With the arrival of the Nova Cinema brand, the name Filmnet was retired.

Channels and content

Nova Cinema operates four multiplex channels:
NovaCinema 1 HD: features blockbusters and premieres, Greek co-productions from Nova, as well as movie awards.
NovaCinema 2 HD: The channel showing movies.
NovaCinema 3 HD: features adventure, crime, fantasy, sci-fi, horror and western movies and as well as adult zone every night.
NovaCinema 4 HD: The series channel, features foreign series with new episodes, broadcast for the first time in Greece, shortly after America’s air time.

Temporary channels
Nova occasionally gives one of their channels a temporary rebrand to air different kinds of seasonal or promotional programming. Examples of this include:
Nova Summer HD: Broadcast from 1 June until 31 August, featuring 2 movies every night.
Nova Christmas HD: Broadcast during the Christmas holidays as a seasonal channel featuring family and kids movies every night.
Nova Stars HD: Broadcast during the whole January and the whole February, featuring 2 awarded/nominated movies every night.
Nova Star Wars: Broadcast from 4 May 2015 until 31 May 2015, featuring Star Wars full-time.
Nova Harry Potter HD: Broadcast from 14 October 2017 until 29 October 2017, featuring Harry Potter full-time.
Nova X-Men HD: Broadcast from 11 May 2018 until 28 May 2018, featuring X-Men full-time.
Nova Thrones HD: Broadcast from 1 April 2019 until 31 May 2019, featuring Game of Thrones full-time.
Nova Rock HD: Broadcast from 15 June 2019 until 31 July 2019, featuring 2 rock music movies every night.

Special Events
NovaCinema 1 HD features special events such as Golden Globe Awards, Screen Actors Guild Awards and BAFTA. It used to broadcast the Academy Awards until 2016 when Nova lost the exclusive rights to the coverage of the ceremony.

Current Hit Series
Absentia
Big Little Lies
Blindspot
Condor
Four Weddings and a Funeral
Gotham
His Dark Materials
Lethal Weapon
Mrs. Fletcher
NCIS
Prodigal Son
Silicon Valley
Succession
The Deuce
The Good Doctor
The Handmaid's Tale
True Detective
Watchmen
Westworld

Former Hit Series
Black Sails
Boardwalk Empire
Cedar Cove
Counterpart
CSI: Crime Scene Investigation
Deadly Class
Deception
Divorce
Game of Thrones
Gomorrah
Gran Hotel
Hannibal
Person of Interest
Satisfaction
Show Me a Hero
The Art of More
The Following
The Leftovers
The Mentalist
The Newsroom
Timeless
Vinyl
Whiskey Cavalier

Logos

References

Movie channels in Greece
Television channels in Greece
Greek-language television stations
Television channels and stations established in 1994
Pay television
Television channel articles with incorrect naming style

cy:FilmNet
nl:FilmNet